Tolland County is a county in the northeastern part of the U.S. state of Connecticut.  As of the 2020 census, its population was 149,788. It is incorporated into 13 towns and was originally formed on 13 October 1785 from portions of eastern Hartford County and western Windham County.

The county is included in the Hartford-East Hartford-Middletown, CT Metropolitan Statistical Area.

Counties in Connecticut have no governmental function; all legal power is vested in the state, city and town governments. The office of High Sheriff in Connecticut counties was officially abolished by ballot in 2000, and corrections and court services were transferred to the state marshals. Tolland County has the same boundaries as the Tolland Judicial District.

Geography
It is the second-smallest county in Connecticut by land area and smallest by total area.

Adjacent counties
Hartford County - west
New London County - south
Windham County - east
Hampden County, Massachusetts - northwest
Worcester County, Massachusetts - northeast

Demographics

2000 census
As of the year 2000, there were 136,364 people, 49,431 households, and 34,156 families living in the county. The population density was 332 sq mi (128/km2).  There were 51,570 housing units at an average density of 126/sq mi (49/km2). The ethnic and racial background of the county's population was 92.3% White, 2.7% Black or African American, 0.2% Native American, 2.3% Asian, 0.03% Pacific Islander, 1.1% from another group, and 1.4% multiracial, while 2.8% of the population were Hispanic or Latino (identifying with any race). Among European-Americans, 14.9% were of Irish, 14.1% Italian, 9.9% English, 8.8% French, 8.2% German, 8.0% Polish and 5.7% French Canadian ancestry. About 9 in 10 spoke English, while 2.9% spoke Spanish and 1.6% French as their first language.

There were 49,431 households, out of which 33.30% had children under the age of 18 living with them, 58.00% were married couples living together, 8.00% had a female householder with no husband present, and 30.90% were non-families. 23.50% of all households were made up of individuals, and 7.70% had someone living alone who was 65 years of age or older. The average household size was 2.54 and the average family size was 3.03.

In the county, the population was spread out, with 23.1% under the age of 18, 12.9% from 18 to 24, 30.7% from 25 to 44, 23.2% from 45 to 64, and 10.2% who were 65 years of age or older. The median age was 36 years. For every 100 females of any age, there were 100.6 males. For every 100 women age 18 and over, there were 99.5 men.

The median income for a household in the county was $59,044, and the median income for a family was $70,856. Men had a median income of $46,619 versus $34,255 for women. The per capita income for the county was $25,474. About 5.6% of the population and 2.9% of all families earned below the poverty line. Out of the total people living in poverty, 4.6% were children, and 5.2% aged 65 or older.

2010 census
As of the 2010 United States Census, there were 152,691 people, 54,477 households, and 36,707 families living in the county. In terms of ethnic/racial background, the 2010 Census found that most of Tolland County's residents were white (89.8%), followed by 3.4% Asian, 3.3% Black or African American, 0.2% American Indian, 1.6% from other races, and 1.8% from two or more races. Those of Hispanic or Latino origin made up 4.3% of the population. In terms of European ancestry, 22.0% were Irish, 16.8% were Italian, 14.3% were English, 14.2% were German, 10.6% were Polish, 5.6% were French Canadian, while 3.5% of the population identified their ancestry as 'American'.

Of the 54,477 households, 31.5% had children under the age of 18 living with them, 54.9% were married couples living together, 8.6% had a female householder with no spouse, 32.6% were non-families, and 24.2% of all households were made up of one individual. The average household size was 2.5 and the average family size was 3.0 people. The median age was 38.3 years.

The median income for a household in the county was $77,175 and the median income for a family was $91,631. Men had a median income of $62,579 versus $46,818 for women. The per capita income for the county was $33,108. About 3.2% of families and 6.4% of the population were below the poverty line, including 5.2% of those under age 18 and 4.6% of those age 65 or over.

Demographic breakdown by town

Income

Data is from the 2010 United States Census and the 2006-2010 American Community Survey 5-Year Estimates.

Race
Data is from the 2007-2011 American Community Survey 5-Year Estimates, ACS Demographic and Housing Estimates, "Race alone or in combination with one or more other races."

Communities

Towns

Andover
Bolton
Columbia
Coventry
Ellington
Hebron
Mansfield
Somers
Stafford
Tolland
Union
Vernon
Willington

Other communities

Amston
Coventry Lake
Crystal Lake
Gilead
Hebron Center
Hydeville
Mashapaug
Mansfield Center
Rockville
Somers center
South Coventry
Stafford Hollow
Stafford Springs
Storrs

Politics

|}

In popular culture
Tolland County is briefly referenced in the novel Moby-Dick by Herman Melville as the place that the ill-fated African-American shipmate, Pip, comes from.

See also
 National Register of Historic Places listings in Tolland County, Connecticut
 New England Civil War Museum

References

External links
 Tolland County 911
 Federal Statistics for Tolland Co. Conn.
 National Register of Historic Places listing for Tolland Co., Connecticut
 State parks and Forests in Tolland County
 Tolland County Chamber of Commerce

 

 
Greater Hartford
1785 establishments in Connecticut
1960 disestablishments in Connecticut
Populated places established in 1785